Capital of Georgia may refer to:

In country of Georgia:
Tbilisi, present capital
Kutaisi, historical capital of the Kingdom of Georgia and former legislative capital

In U.S. state of Georgia:
Atlanta, present capital
Savannah, Georgia, capital of the Province of Georgia, one of the Thirteen Colonies of British America
 The Georgia State Capitol building